Pygmalion  is the Greek version of the Phoenician name Pu'mayyaton. Hesychios of Alexandria transcribed it as Pygmaion.

In Greek mythology, Pygmalion was a sculptor who fell in love with his statue.

Persons
 Pygmalion of Tyre, King of Tyre from 831 to 785 BC

Greek masculine given names